During the Parade of Nations portion of the 1992 Summer Olympics opening ceremony, athletes from each country participating in the Olympics paraded in the arena, preceded by their flag. The flag was borne by a sportsperson from that country chosen either by the National Olympic Committee or by the athletes themselves to represent their country.

Parade order
As the nation of the first modern Olympic Games, Greece entered the stadium first; whereas, the host nation Spain marched last. Other countries entered in alphabetical order in the French language, instead of both Catalan and Spanish (despite that these languages had been displayed on the name boards and used to announce the country names), due to the political sensitivity surrounding the use of Catalan. Athletes from Independent Olympic Participants did not attend the parade of nations, but still competed at the Games. The Unified Team, composed of former Soviet states, marched with Olympic flag, then followed by twelve flag bearers carrying their respective nations.

Whilst most countries entered under their short names, a few entered under more formal or alternative names, mostly due to political and naming disputes. The Republic of China (commonly known as Taiwan) entered with the compromised name and flag of "Chinese Taipei" ("Taipei chinois") under T so that they did not enter together with conflicting People's Republic of China (commonly known as China), which entered as the "People's Republic of China" ("République Populairé de Chine") under C. The Republic of the Congo entered as the "Republic of the Congo" ("République du Congo") while the Democratic Republic of Congo entered under its former name, Zaire.

List
The following is a list of each country's announced flag bearer. The list is sorted by the order in which each nation appears in the parade of nations. The names are given in their official designations by the IOC.

Notes

See also
 1988 Summer Olympics national flag bearers
 1996 Summer Olympics national flag bearers

References

1992 Summer Olympics
Lists of Olympic flag bearers